Episcopal Diocese of Southwestern Virginia is the diocese of the Episcopal Church in the United States of America located in the southwest area of Virginia. It is in Province III (for the Middle Atlantic region).  The diocese includes 51 parishes in the state's southwestern region, including the cities of Lynchburg and Roanoke, with offices in the latter city.

External links
The Episcopal Diocese of Southwestern Virginia
Journal of the Annual Council, Diocese of Southwestern Virginia

Southwestern Virginia
Diocese of Southwestern
Christian organizations established in 1919
1919 establishments in Virginia
Province 3 of the Episcopal Church (United States)